

Ferdinand Foltin (30 November 1916 – 18 May 2007) was an Austrian officer in the paratroop forces (Fallschirmjäger) of Nazi Germany during World War II and a general in the post-war Austrian Armed Forces. He was a recipient of the Knight's Cross of the Iron Cross.

Awards and decorations

 Knight's Cross of the Iron Cross on  9 June 1944 as Hauptmann and commander of the II./Fallschirmjäger-Regiment 3

References

Citations

Bibliography

 

1916 births
2007 deaths
Military personnel from Vienna
Austrian generals
Austrian military personnel of World War II
Fallschirmjäger of World War II
Recipients of the Knight's Cross of the Iron Cross
World War II prisoners of war held by the United Kingdom
German prisoners of war in World War II